Hamidreza Pejman (born 1980) is an Iranian collector, patron, film producer and the founder and director of Pejman Foundation.

Biography
Pejman earned a bachelor's degree in Theater Directing at Sooreh Art University in Tehran, followed by a bachelor's degree in Mining Engineering from Tehran's Azad University. His interest in art began when he was a university student; he started collecting art pieces in 2013 and over time, he made a collection of contemporary art pieces from both Iranian and international artists with a stronger focus on Iranian artists.

Hamidreza Pejman's independent and nonprofit art foundation was established in 2015 in Tehran and has been supporting many Iranian and foreign artists for recent years.

Pejman participated in two movie projects as a producer: The Image Book movie directed by Jean-Luc Godard and Restored Communication movie directed by Neil Beloufa. He also is one of the co-producers of the movie, See You Friday, Robinson! directed by Mitra Farahani which won the Encounters Special Jury Award in the Berlin International Film Festival.

Pejman Foundation 
Pejman Foundation is an Iranian nonprofit art foundation, established in 2015, to promote art and to connect the common aspects of art and philosophy. Throughout recent years, the activities of Pejman Foundation has expanded beyond building its collection and its grant and sponsorship program. Through the organization of workshops, lectures, and panel discussions; the invitation of international experts; its artist exchange programs; as well as its support for cultural research and publications, by a program of exhibitions, talks, and events at its multiple sites including Argo Factory and Kandovan Building.

Argo Factory 
The foundation headquarters, Argo Factory, which in the 1960s and 70s produced beverages, was, evidently, built in the 1920s and is one of the first industrial factories in the country.

Although quite specific in terms of architecture, with its tall chimney and geographical location at the center of the city, the building was abandoned for forty years and its owners were blocked from re-assuming ownership. Pejman Foundation made the decision to acquire the factory from the state to engage in its restoration. Its reconstruction project was led by Ahmadreza Schricker Architecture–North (ASA North).

Due to its special design, Argo factory managed to receive many architectural awards at the global level. In 2022, this building, along with two other Iranian projects, among 463 submitted works from 16 countries, was included in the list of final candidates for the Aga Khan Award for Architecture. Six projects were selected as the final winners including Argo Factory.

Argo Factory also won the 2022 Dezeen Architecture Award, organized by the Dezeen website. This annual award includes three sections: architecture, interior and design, with 14 categories in each section. The final winner will be selected from each section and will be honored as the three special works of Dezeen Architecture Award.

In the fifth edition of these awards, Argo Factory was among the names of selected projects in the final stage or short list of the cultural buildings section. Argo Factory was selected as the final winner of this section and also became the Dezeen Awards 2022 architecture project of the year.

Collaborations 
 The Musée d'Art Moderne de Paris, a video art exhibition curated by Odile Burlurax and Jessica Castex in Argo Factory (07/2021 – 09/2021)
 Balthazar Auxietre and Hayoun Kwon, an interactive VR installation in Argo Factory (12/2017 – 02/2018)
 Neil Beloufa, exhibition in Argo Factory (02/2017 – 04/2017)
 Neil Beloufa, exhibition in Palais de Tokyo, Paris (2012)
 Tehran Museum of Contemporary Art (TMOCA), "Ketab-e-Karnameh" book publication

Filmography
 See You Friday, Robinson!, French/Swiss production directed by Iranian director Mitra Farahani (2022)
 Subtotals, a short film directed by Iranian director Mohammadreza Farzad (2022)
 Screen Talk, an experimental online production and distribution by French artist Neil Beloufa (2020)
 Restored Communication, Directed by French artist Neil Beloufa
 People’s Palace. Directed by French artist Neil Beloufa (2018)
 The Image Book, Swiss/French production directed by Jean-Luc Godard (2018)

Awards 
 See You Friday, Robinson!, Black Canvas Contemporary Film Festival 2022, Winner of The Best Film Award
 See You Friday, Robinson!, New Horizon Film Festival 2022, Winner of Grand Prix
 See You Friday, Robinson!, Berlin International Film Festival 2022, Winner of Encounters Award – Special Jury
 The Image Book, Cahiers du Cinéma 2019, Winner of Top 10 Film Award for Best Film
 The Image Book, Cannes Film Festival 2018, Winner of Palme d'Or Spéciale
 The Image Book, International Cinephile Society (ICS) Cannes Awards 2018, Winner of ICS Cannes Award for Grand Prix
 The Image Book, International Cinephile Society Awards 2019, Winner of ICS Award for Best Picture Not Released in 2018

See also 
 Pejman Foundation
 Argo Factory
 The Image Book

References

Iranian film directors
Persian-language film directors
1980 births
Living people
Islamic Azad University alumni